Michael Yelton is an English lay authority of the history of the Church of England, particularly the Anglo-Catholic movement. He is secretary of the Anglo-Catholic History Society and a retired as a county court judge on 22 April 2020.

Works
Peter Anson: Monk, Writer and Artist: An Introduction to His Life and Work (2005) 
Alfred Hope Patten and the Shrine of Our Lady of Walsingham (2006) 
Empty Tabernacles: Twelve Lost Churches of London (2006) 
Alfred Hope Patten: His Life and Times in Pictures (2007) 
Anglican Church-building in London 1915-1945 (2007) 
Anglican Papalism: An Illustrated History, 1900-1960 (2009) 
Outposts of the Faith: Anglo-Catholicism in Some Rural Parishes (2009) 
The Twenty One: An Anglo-Catholic Rebellion in London, 1929 (2009) 
The South India Controversy and the Converts of 1955-1956: An Episode in Recent Anglo-Catholic History (2010) 
An Anglo-Catholic Scrapbook, Produced to Mark the Tenth Anniversary of the Foundation of the Anglo-Catholic History Society (2010) 
Anglican Church-building in London 1946-2012 (2013) 
More Empty Tabernacles: Another Twelve Lost Churches of London (2014) 
(foreword), Anglican Abbot: Dom Denys Prideaux (2016) 
Martin Travers: His Life and Work (2016) 
St Silas, Pentonville: The First 150 Years (2017) 
Twenty Priests for Twenty Years: A Commemorative Volume to Mark the Twentieth Anniversary of the Anglo-Catholic History Society (2020) 
An Anglo-Catholic Miscellany (2021) 
The Community of Reparation to Jesus in the Blessed Sacrament and the Church of St Alphege, Southwark (2022) 
Alfred Hope Patten and the Shrine of Our Lady of Walsingham (2022)

References 

English Anglo-Catholics
English historians
20th-century English judges
Living people
Year of birth missing (living people)